is a female-only secondary school in Hatsukaichi, Hiroshima, Japan. It was founded in 1929.

The school has a marching band and color guard, majorette club, and a non-marching band. More school activities include kendo, volleyball, softball, soccer, and gymnastics.

The student body and faculty travel to Hawaii as an additional event.

Sanyo receives foreign exchange students from several countries and sends exchange students to various countries.

External links
Official Website

Girls' schools in Japan
Educational institutions established in 1929
Schools in Hiroshima Prefecture
High schools in Hiroshima Prefecture
Buildings and structures in Hiroshima Prefecture
1929 establishments in Japan